Rainforest Foundation US is a non-profit NGO working in Central and South America. It is one of the first international organizations to support the indigenous peoples of the world's rainforests in their efforts to protect their environment and fulfill their rights to land, life and livelihood.

The idea that the indigenous peoples of the world are holders of a specific set of rights and are also the victims of historically unique forms of discrimination is most completely/thoroughly enunciated by the United Nations Declaration on the Rights of Indigenous Peoples, adopted by the UN General Assembly in 2007. Rainforest Foundation US works to protect and defend indigenous rights, thereby protecting the rainforests.

History

The Rainforest Foundation was founded in 1988 by Sting and his wife Trudie Styler after the indigenous leader of the Kayapo people of Brazil, the Chief Raoni made a personal request to them to help his community protect their lands and culture. The Rainforest Foundation's initial project was successful in coordinating the first ever privately funded demarcation of indigenous land in the region – 17,000 square miles of traditional land, the Menkragnoti area, next to Xingu National Park, was demarcated and legally titled to the Kayapo people by the Brazilian government in 1993.

Since then Rainforest Foundation US, along with its sister organizations Rainforest Foundation UK, Rainforest Foundation Norway, and the Rainforest Foundation Fund, have protected a total of 28 million acres of forest in 20 different rainforest countries around the globe.

Current issues
With its goal of conserving the rainforest, Rainforest Foundation US advocates for the rights of the indigenous inhabitants of the rainforest, by providing project-related grants, capacity-building expertise and direct technical assistance to its local partners on the ground, including indigenous communities and grassroots organizations.

Rainforest Foundation's current work is focused around three main issues:

Protecting lands
Rainforest Foundation US believes that indigenous peoples can defend their communities, and their rainforests, against development pressures if they have secure rights to their lands and natural resources. They are not alone in this belief - it is widely accepted that indigenous communities are effective stewards of the environment. Securing indigenous land rights is particularly crucial to conserving the rainforest as many of the world's remaining large tracts of intact rainforests are found in traditional indigenous lands.

However, indigenous peoples are often not recognized as the owners of their land, even if they have lived there for hundreds or thousands of years. Without official titles, many indigenous communities have little recourse but to watch as government or corporate interventions profit from and sometimes even damage or destroy huge tracts of their forests without their consent.

Moreover, indigenous groups face significant legal, technical and cultural hurdles to obtaining legal recognition of their land rights, including: inadequate national legislation, difficulties with accurate marking of boundaries, lack of good maps and documentation, historic discrimination, unfamiliarity with legal systems, and geographic isolation. Rainforest Foundation US works with indigenous communities to overcome these hurdles.

Building effective local organizations

Indigenous communities in the rainforest face frequent threats to their homes and livelihoods from land invasions, illegal resource extraction, and the undermining of their rights at the local and national levels. Indigenous peoples are often not respected, nor even recognized, as rights holders, and traditional indigenous governance practices and structures are not respected by local and national authorities or by outsiders interested in exploiting the resources of the rainforest.

As indigenous peoples often lack the information, resources and technical skills necessary to exercise their rights and advocate on their own behalf, Rainforest Foundation US funds and collaborates on various capacity-building initiatives of indigenous leadership and representative indigenous organizations. They provide technical support, legal guidance, and funding for community training workshops. These workshops train local leaders in building administratively and financially strong organizations that are capable of effectively managing social and economic development projects on their lands as well defending their rights. Rainforest Foundation US also assists communities with formalizing their traditional governance practices to ensure that they are acknowledged and respected by local and national authorities.

Influencing climate change policy

Rainforest Foundation US works to provide indigenous peoples with independent and balanced information about climate change science, indigenous rights and international policy. They develop and adapt training materials, and fund local workshops and national level trainings for indigenous leaders. They also connect communities with the legal and technical expertise they need to analyze climate change policies and be informed and effective participants in local, regional and national policy discussions regarding climate change policy.

Tropical deforestation is responsible for nearly 15% of the world's annual greenhouse gas emissions. The world's existing rainforests are also massive carbon sinks, absorbing approximately 20% of the world's CO2 production each year. Thus, in recent years, climate change debates have focused increasingly on the need to develop international and national policies to reduce deforestation and rainforest degradation, known as 'REDD' programs.

Indigenous peoples' lands contain some of the last remaining expanses of intact rainforest on the planet, placing their communities in the center of major policy debates on combating climate change. Such climate change and REDD policies have the potential to provide significant social and economic benefits to the indigenous peoples of the rainforest. But, if poorly designed or implemented, these same policies risk establishing top-down models for forest protection, leading to an increase in conflicts over land ownership and the unfair distribution of benefits.

In many countries government consultations have been rushed and have not allowed time for the communities to understand complex concepts and programs, seek independent consultations, or have adequate internal discussions to decide if and how they want to participate. Many agreements are being formed which violate the indigenous communities' right to Free, Prior and Informed Consent - a right enshrined by a number of globally ratified declarations and laws. (e.g. the United Nations Declaration on the Rights of Indigenous Peoples). The rush to develop such climate change mitigation policies in several countries has also exacerbated existing problems with indigenous land rights.

Current projects

Rainforest Foundation US is currently funding and collaborating on work in four countries:

Brazil:
The territory of Raposa Serra do Sol, located in the northern Brazilian Amazon, is home to an about 18,000 Macuxi, Wapishana, Ingarikó, Taurepang and Patamona people.  For over 30 years these communities have worked together to gain legal recognition of their traditional lands and protection of their rights in the region. They have been opposed by cattle ranchers, rice growers, and others with economic interests in their lands, who have used violence and intimidation against the indigenous peoples to continue their illegal activities. The length of the fight and the severity of the situation, led the Indigenous Council of Roraima (CIR), together with Rainforest Foundation US, to file a petition for help with the Inter-American Commission on Human Rights in 2004. While, In April 2005, the Brazilian government formally recognized the indigenous people's rights to their land in Raposa Serra do Sol, with a decree which called for all illegal non-indigenous settlers to leave the territory some rice-growers refuse to leave and have retaliated violently against indigenous communities, leading to further court cases. In 2009, the Supreme Court of Brazil issued a decision reaffirming the rights of the indigenous peoples in Raposa Serra do Sol, and again mandating the exit of the rice-growers. There is currently a case  with the Inter-American Commission on Human rights focusing primarily on violence perpetrated against the community and impunity of those who allegedly committed acts of intimidation including physical violence against the communities.

Guyana:
 Rainforest Foundation US works with the Amerindian Peoples Association in Guyana. The APA is a national representative body of indigenous peoples in Guyana. The two organizations are working together to ensure that indigenous people are effective participants in the design and implementation of climate change programs, in particular REDD programs, that could affect their lands and resource use and to ensure that there are viable economic alternatives for the Indigenous communities of the rainforest. RF-US funds have helped the APA: hold community level workshops that train indigenous peoples about climate change science, policy, and indigenous rights and also to hold media and advocacy trainings for indigenous leaders to become stronger advocates for their people. Nearly 80% of Guyana is covered in rainforests, and those forests are home to over 69,000 indigenous people who have been living in and managing them for centuries but who still lack secure tenure over their lands.

Panama:
 The Wounaan people live primarily in the heavily forested Darién Province of eastern Panama. The Embera, Wounaan and Kuna currently are asking for 29 collective lands titles Eastern Panama, of these 24 have yet to be granted. These lands include significant swaths of untouched rainforest, as well as intact mangrove and lowland forest ecosystems, and ecologically important rivers and estuaries. However, the lands are threatened by the invasions of outsiders who clear forests for agriculture, cattle-raising, and other development projects. The Indigenous communities argue that they need legal recognition of their land rights in order to protect their natural resources. In late 2008, the Panamanian Congress passed a law which will facilitate the demarcation of indigenous collective land rights, followed in 2010 by a law setting out all the steps necessary for recognition of collective lands. RF-US is working with the communities to formalize recognition for all 29 collective land titles covering over 1 million acres of land, by training communities in mapping their territories using traditional mapping techniques as well as drone and cell phone technology aided mapping and monitoring of territories.  Rainforest Foundation also provides assistance with legal work, community meetings, gathering necessary documents, and subsequent negotiations with the government. The Rainforest Foundation also engages in other projects as requested by communities; for example in 2014 lead a project to bring potable water to the now-titled community of Caña Blanca by installing solar panels to power a water filtration system.

Peru:
In 2015 Rainforest Foundation US helped the Ashéninka community of Saweto Alto Tamayo obtain title to 200,000 acres of rainforest land.  The community of Saweto engaged in a 12-year struggle to have their lands recognized. After 11 years of fighting for recognition, Saweto's leaders were murdered in 2014, leading the widows and daughters to take on the leadership of their community. Since the murders, Rainforest Foundation US stepped in to help the community and has supplied legal counsel, aided the community in gathering documents and negotiating with the government to help the community of Saweto obtain legal title to their lands.  the organization has also supported the community in its demands for a full investigation of the murders of its leaders. In addition, Rainforest Foundation US helps with general advocacy and community training, and planning. Rainforest Foundation US also works with communities in Madre de Dios region in Peru and in 2016 is beginning program to protect 26 million acres of Amazonian rainforest in Southeastern Peru.

Examples of past projects
Brazil:
 Rainforest Foundation US worked in the state of Pará with indigenous peoples, led by the Xingu peoples, to inform local communities, through workshops and outreach events, about likely impacts from the hotly contentious Belo Monte Dam  proposed for the Xingu River in the region, as well as about the communities' rights and the resources available to them in expressing those rights and protesting the dam.

 The territory of Raposa Serra do Sol, located in the northern Brazilian Amazon, is home to an about 18,000 Macuxi, Wapishana, Ingarikó, Taurepang and Patamona people.  For over 30 years these communities have worked together to gain legal recognition of their traditional lands and protection of their rights in the region. They have been opposed by cattle ranchers, rice growers, and others with economic interests in their lands, who have used violence and intimidation against the indigenous peoples to continue their illegal activities. The length of the fight and the severity of the situation, led the Indigenous Council of Roraima (CIR), together with the Rainforest Foundation US, to file a petition for help with the Inter-American Commission on Human Rights in 2004. In April 2005, the Brazilian government formally recognized the indigenous people's rights to their land in Raposa Serra do Sol, with a decree which called for all illegal non-indigenous settlers to leave the territory. Some rice-growers refused to leave and retaliated violently against indigenous communities, leading to further court cases. In 2009, the Supreme Court of Brazil issued a decision reaffirming the rights of the indigenous peoples in Raposa Serra do Sol, and again mandating the exit of the rice-growers.

 From 2000 through 2010 Rainforest Foundation US partnered with the Organization of Indigenous Women of Roraima (OMIR) to build their organizational capacity so they can better defend the rights and well-being of the indigenous women of Roraima as well as to set up local sources of income in the form of local crafts markets. The organization also held workshops and informational sessions on priority issues to women, such as domestic violence and alcoholism.

Panama:
 The Kuna people live in the autonomous community of Kuna Yala, much of which is made up of low-lying islands off the coast of Panama. Climate change will affect all indigenous groups in Panama, but the Kuna are particularly concerned since many of their communities are already experiencing serious flooding and are threatened by sea level rise. Panama is participating in both the UN's and the World Bank's large-scale REDD financing programs aimed at combating climate change. Unfortunately, the government of Panama did not secure the free, prior and informed consent of their indigenous peoples before entering into these programs despite the fact that approximately 30% of Panama's forests overlap with traditional indigenous territories. Rainforest Foundation US has worked with the Kuna people's representative NGO to educate Kuna communities on issues related to climate change and REDD, and to ensure that their organization was able to advocate for the indigenous rights agenda in Panama and to bring an informed indigenous voice to bear on REDD policy designs and other development and forestry management programs.

In 2009 and 2010 Rainforest Foundation US partnered with a number of indigenous organizations representing the Kandozi and Shapra peoples who live in Datem del Marañón Province, in Peru's northern Amazon, as well as with other NGOs, to find ways for the communities to exercise their legal right to healthcare to the Peruvian state. These communities lack access to all basic social services, particularly health care (a public good and legal right to all Peruvian citizens). They are also threatened by an epidemic of Hepatitis B, as approximately 70% of the entire population was infected in 2000.[38] Rainforest Foundation US set up community workshops teaching indigenous peoples about their rights and providing them with legal advocacy tools and pro bono expert legal work. The advocacy was successful, and in 2010 government officials traveled to the area to investigate the situation.

Funding
Rainforest Foundation US is a non-profit organization. The majority of its financing comes from grants from foundations and other non-profit organizations, the Rainforest Fund among them, as well as from individual and corporate donations.

Corporate alliances and promotions
Rainforest Foundation US has worked together with various companies to promote their cause. Such alliances include:

 The Volvic "Drink 1, Give 10" campaign in North American markets. From June 27 til December 25, 2011, Volvic donated 5 cents to Rainforest Foundation US for each bottle of Volvic natural spring water sold. 2011 is the fourth year of this campaign.
 The 'philosophy' cosmetics company designed a "green multitasking shampoo, shower gel & bubble bath" and is donating 100% of net proceeds from the sale of this product to Rainforest Foundation US.
 Opel automotive company partnered with Rainforest Foundation US for the Panamanian leg of their current "Project Earth" expedition, billed as an aspect of the company's environmental sustainability efforts.

Criticism
Since 2008, Rainforest Foundation US has received four stars out of four from Charity Navigator, with an efficiency score of 38.93 out of 40. However, from 2002 to 2004 the organization was given zero stars, primarily because only 43–60% of funds during those years were spent on programs on the ground.

See also
 Reducing emissions from deforestation and forest degradation
 Self-determination
 Traditional ecological knowledge
 Sustainable development
 Indigenous land rights
 Indigenous peoples of the Americas
 Amazon Rainforest
 Deforestation of the Amazon Rainforest
 Deforestation in Brazil
 Conservation movement

References

External links
Rainforest Foundation US

Environmental organizations based in New York (state)
International environmental organizations
501(c)(3) organizations